The 11th Golden Horse Awards (Mandarin:第11屆金馬獎) took place on October 30, 1973 at Zhongshan Hall in Taipei, Taiwan.

Winners and nominees 
Winners are listed first, highlighted in boldface.

References

11th
1973 film awards
1973 in Taiwan